The Philippine Science High School - Bicol Region Campus (PSHS-BRC) is the seventh campus of the Philippine Science High School System, a specialized public high school in the Philippines. Founded in 1998, it caters to scientifically and mathematically gifted high school students of the Bicol Region. It is located in Tagongtong, Goa, Camarines Sur.

External links
PSHS Bicol Region Campus official website

Philippine Science High School System
High schools in Camarines Sur